Mead is a surname. Notable people with the surname include:

Albert E. Mead (1861–1909), fifth Governor of U.S. state of Washington
Andrea Mead Lawrence (1932–2009), American alpine skier and Olympic gold medalist
Andrew Mead (born 1952), American justice
Benjamin C. Mead (1873–1934), American lawyer
Beth Mead (born 1995), English association footballer
Carver Mead (born 1934), U.S. computer scientist
Cato Mead (c. 1761–1846), black American Revolutionary War veteran
Charlie Mead (1921–2014), Canadian baseball player
Chip Mead (1950–1993), American race car driver from Dayton, Ohio
Chris Mead (1940–2003), ornithologist
Courtland Mead (born 1987), U.S. actor, best known for playing Danny Torrance in Stephen King's The Shining
Cowles Mead (1776–1844), U.S. Representative from Georgia
Cyril Mead, birth name of Syd Little (born 1942), British comedian
Daniel W. Mead (1862–1948), American engineer
Darren Mead (born 1971), Australian rules footballer
David Mead (disambiguation), several people
Dorothy Mead (1928–1975), English painter
Elizabeth Storrs Mead (1832–1917), American educator and President of Mount Holyoke College
Elwood Mead (1858–1936), U.S. politician and engineer, head of the Bureau of Reclamation
George Herbert Mead (1863–1931), philosopher, sociologist
G. R. S. Mead (1863–1933), English author, editor, and esotericist
Hassan Mead (born 1989), cross country and track and field athlete
James M. Mead (1885–1964), U.S. Senator from New York
John A. Mead (1841–1920), U.S. politician from Vermont
Jon Mead (born 1967), Canadian curler
Larkin Goldsmith Mead (1815–1910), American sculptor
Lawrence Mead (born 1943), American political scientist
Lee Mead (born 1981), British musical theatre actor
Les Mead (1909–1996), Australian rugby league footballer
Lynda Lee Mead (born 1939), 1960 winner of the Miss America pageant
Marcia Mead (1879–1967), architect 
Margaret Mead (1901–1978), anthropologist
Mary Mead (1935–1996), rancher and Wyoming politician
Matt Mead (born 1962), Governor of Wyoming
Matthew Mead (disambiguation)
Michael Mead (born 1956), English professional ballroom dance champion and choreographer
Mike Mead (first credit 1985), American drummer
Nancy R. Mead (born 1942), American computer scientist
Owen Mead (1892–1942), New Zealand soldier
Phil Mead (1887–1958), English cricketer
Richard Mead (1673–1754), English physician
Richelle Mead (born 1976), American fantasy author
Shepherd Mead (1914–1994), American author
Sidney Moko Mead (born 1927), New Zealand Māori anthropologist, historian, artist, teacher and writer
Silas Mead (1834–1909), Baptist minister in Adelaide, South Australia
Sister Janet Mead (born 1938), Australian Catholic nun and musician
Slade Mead (born 1961), former U.S. Senator for Arizona
Solomon Mead (1829–1905), American academic administrator
Steven Mead (born 1962), British euphonium solo player
Stu Mead (born 1955), American painter
Syd Mead (1933–2019), American industrial designer, worked on films such as Blade Runner
Taylor Mead (1924–2013), American writer and actor
Theodore Luqueer Mead (1852–1936), American naturalist
Tim Mead (born 1981), English countertenor
Tom Mead (1918–2004), Australian politician
Walter Mead (cricketer) (1869–1954), English Essex cricketer
Walter Russell Mead (born 1952), American foreign thinker
William Rutherford Mead (1846–1928), structural engineer, co-founder of the architecture firm McKim, Mead, and White

See also
Meade (surname)
Meads (surname)

English-language surnames